Bei tempi is an album by Italian singer-songwriter Roberto Vecchioni, released in 1985.

Track listing
"Bei tempi" ("Good Times"; Roberto Vecchioni, Roberto Morandi)
"Livingstone" (Vecchioni, Michelangelo Romano)
"La mia ragazza" ("My Girlfriend"; Vecchioni, Romano)
"Piccolo amore" ("Little Love"; Vecchioni)
"Gastone e Astolfo" (Vecchioni)
"Millenovantanove" ("One thousand ninety nine"; Vecchioni)
"Fata" (Vecchioni, Romano)
"Fratel Coniglietto" (Vecchioni)

References

1985 albums
Roberto Vecchioni albums